Claus Barrit Bork Hansen (31 December 1963 – 21 March 2001), nicknamed "Karate Claus", was a Danish outlaw biker and gangster who served as the European sergeant-at-arms of the Bandidos Motorcycle Club, as well as the president of the club's Hedehusene-based Mideast chapter. He was later expelled from the Bandidos and was murdered by members of his former club following an internal feud.

Bandidos
Hansen was a senior Bandidos member for five to six years, serving as the European sergeant-at-arms in Marseille, France, before returning to Denmark where he was allegedly a candidate for the club's national presidency. During the Nordic Biker War in Denmark (1995–1997), he was personally appointed as the bodyguard of European president Jim Tinndahn, with whom he travelled to France and Australia. Hansen opposed the peace treaty with the Hells Angels which ended the biker war in September 1997, and later became president of the Bandidos "Mideast" chapter in Hedehusene. An internal feud began in August 2000 following the expulsion of Hansen's close friend, Mickey Borgfjord Larsen. After disbanding the chapter by expelling all members and subsequently burning all Bandidos symbols in the clubhouse, Hansen was ousted from the Bandidos and told by club leadership that he must leave the property by 1 March 2001. He transformed the former Bandidos clubhouse into a branch of the Red & White Crew, a Hells Angels support club, and also considered founding an Outlaws charter.

Murder
On 21 March 2001, Hansen was assassinated after being shot twenty-six times with three handguns and two shotguns on A.F. Beyersvej in Vanløse, Copenhagen as he returned from a visit to a restaurant with his girlfriend, porn star Dorthe Damsgaard. The police had several times, as late as the day before, warned him that he was on the Bandidos' hit list and offered him protection, which he refused. Damsgaard also received death threats after Hansen's murder. Hansen was cremated at Bispebjerg Cemetery on 7 April.

Kriminalpolitiet investigated the killing and later arrested four full-patch members of the Bandidos, who were charged with Hansen's murder. During the trial, it emerged that the Bandidos and Hells Angels held a crisis meeting on the street in front of a café in Sankt Hans Torv in Nørrebro two evenings before Hansen was shot dead. One of the men accused of the murder – Roskilde Bandidos chapter president Karl Martin Thorup – denied that the meeting between the Bandidos and Hells Angels in Nørrebro was about Hansen and his association with the Red & White Crew. It later emerged during the trial, however, that the Bandidos and Hells Angels feared a new biker war because Hansen was suspected of pitting the two clubs against each other in revenge for his expulsion from the Bandidos. The HAMC leadership agreed at the meeting with senior Bandidos members that the Bandidos could kill Hansen. On 12 April 2002, Jens Christian Thorup was sentenced to life in prison for the killing at the Eastern High Court. The twelve jurors and three magistrates also decided that he should be admitted to a psychiatric hospital when the Judicial Council determined he was mentally ill. On 15 January 2003, the Supreme Court ruled that his sentence should be reduced to sixteen years in prison. The other three suspects – Kent "Kemo" Sørensen, Karl Martin Thorup and Peter Buch Rosenberg – were acquitted of charges of murder and conspiracy to murder on 11 April 2002.

Hansen had made a pact with Mickey Borgfjord Larsen in which they both vowed to take revenge in the event of one another's murder. After Hansen's assassination, Larsen threatened the lives of several high-ranking Bandidos and was himself subsequently killed in a car bomb at Rigshospitalet Glostrup on 17 September 2003.

See also
 Bandidos MC criminal allegations and incidents in Denmark

References

Further reading
 Mads Brügger and Nikolaj Thomassen: Abemanden (2004) 

1963 births
2001 deaths
2001 murders in Europe
20th-century Danish criminals
21st-century Danish criminals
Danish male criminals
Danish gangsters
Murdered gangsters
People from Copenhagen
Deaths by firearm in Denmark
Danish murder victims
People murdered in Denmark
Assassinated Danish people
Bandidos Motorcycle Club